Bongzilla is an American stoner metal band that formed in Madison, Wisconsin in 1995. They released their debut extended play, Mixed Bag, the following year through Rhetoric Records. Much of Bongzilla's lyrics are centered around cannabis use and similar themes. Following a six-year hiatus, the band reformed in 2015 and embarked upon a North American tour. The band's most recent album, Weedsconsin, was released in 2021 through the label Heavy Psych Sounds. Weedsconsin was Bongzilla's first new release in sixteen years.

Members 
Current
 Mike "Muleboy" Makela – vocals (1995–2009, 2015–present), bass (2020–present), guitar (1995–2009, 2015–2020)
 Jeff "Spanky" Schultz – guitar (1995–2009, 2015–present)
 Mike "Magma" Henry – drums (1995–2009, 2015–present)

Former
 Nate Bush – bass (1995)
 Nate "Weed Dragon" Dethlefsen (a.k.a. Meanstreak) – bass (1995–2001)
 Cooter "Black Bong" Brown – bass  (2001–2005, 2015–2020)
 Dave "Dixie" Collins (Weedeater) – bass (2005–2006)

Timeline

Discography 
Studio albums

EPs and splits

Compilation albums

Live albums

References

External links 

Bongzilla on Relapse Records
Bongzilla at Myspace
Bongzilla at Artistdirect
Bongzilla at Spirit of Metal

Heavy metal musical groups from Wisconsin
Musical quartets
American sludge metal musical groups
American stoner rock musical groups
Relapse Records artists
Rock music groups from Wisconsin